Schickedanz is a German surname. Notable people with the surname include:

Albert Schickedanz (1846–1915), Austro-Hungarian architect
Gustav Schickedanz (1895–1977), German entrepreneur
Madeleine Schickedanz (born 1943), German entrepreneur

See also
Schickendantz

German-language surnames